Yersinia proxima is a Gram-negative bacterium in the family Yersiniaceae that is phylogenetically close to Yersinia enterocolitica. Members of this species has been found in human feces.

References

External links
LSPN lpsn.dsmz.de
Type strain of Yersinia proxima at BacDive -  the Bacterial Diversity Metadatabase

proxima
Bacteria described in 2020